Stankov is a Bulgarian masculine surname, its feminine counterpart is Stankova. Notable people with the surname include:

Sport

Association football
Aleksandar Stankov (born 1991), Macedonian football player
Aleksandar Stankov (manager) (born 1964), Bulgarian football manager and former player
Antonio Stankov (born 1991), Dutch-Macedonian football player
Kiril Stankov (1949–1991), Bulgarian football player
Martin Stankov (born 1974), Bulgarian football defender
Nikolay Stankov (born 1984), Bulgarian football player
Zdravko Stankov (born 1977), Bulgarian football defender

Other sports
Blanka Stankova (born 1973), Czech volleyball player
Georgi Stankov (born 1943), Bulgarian boxer 
Karyna Stankova, Ukrainian wrestler
Nenad Stankov (born 1992), Macedonian basketball small forward

Other people
Dušan Stankov (1900–1983), Yugoslavian engineer 
Lazar Stankov, Australian psychologist
Zvezdelina Stankova (born 1969), mathematician

See also
 Staňkov (disambiguation)

Bulgarian-language surnames